Shaka Loveless Grøn (born 5 March 1984) is a Danish rapper and singer with reggae roots. He is also a lead vocalist for the Danish hip-hop / R&B band The Gypsies (earlier known as The Electric Gypsies with a more rock-oriented sound).

Shaka Loveless is the son of famous blues player James Loveless and has been a regular part of the Danish blues scene, as a solo artist, and in his long collaboration as member of Shades of Blue, where he played with guitarist Uffe Steen, bassist Morten Brauner and drummer Claus Daugaard.

Besides being lead vocalist for The Gypsies, he has also developed a successful solo career with his 2012 charting hit "Tomgang" that rose to No. 1 on the Danish Singles Chart. The platinum selling single "Tomgang" is produced by Donkey Sound like the rest of his debut album which was released by Universal Music in October 2012.

Discography

Albums
with The Gypsies
2007: One Hand Up
2009: For the Feeble Hearted
solo

Singles
with The Gypsies
2007: "Underground"
2008: "Part of Me"
2009: "The Mirror"
2009: "American Girl"

Solo

Featured in

References

External links
Facebook

Danish male singers
Danish rappers
Danish hip hop musicians
Danish people of American descent
1984 births
Living people